Kuris may refer to:

Kuris, Armenia, a village
Kūris, a Lithuanian surname
Konca Kuriş (1961–1999), a Turkish feminist

See also

Kuri (disambiguation)

it:Kuris